Epiphany proclamation may refer to:

Epiphany proclamation (religion), an annual declaration of the dates of Christian moveable feasts
Epiphany proclamation (politics), a 2013 political declaration associated with the Czech presidential election